Fort George may refer to:

Forts

Bermuda
 Fort George, Bermuda, built in the late 18th Century and successively developed through the 19th Century, on a site that had been in use as a watch and signal station since 1612

British Virgin Islands
 Fort George, Tortola, a fort built at the time of the American Revolution

Canada
 Fort George, Ontario, a 19th-century fort in Niagara-on-the-Lake, Ontario
 Fort George, Nova Scotia, a.k.a. Halifax Citadel National Historic Site in Halifax, Nova Scotia
Fort George, A townsite later amalgamated into Prince George, British Columbia
 Fort George (electoral district), a provincial electoral district centered on the town of Prince George, British Columbia
 South Fort George, a suburb of Prince George, British Columbia, once its own townsite. 
 Fort George, a Hudson's Bay Company post near Chisasibi, Quebec
 Fort George, a Hudson's Bay Company post at the mouth of the George River at present-day Kangiqsualujjuaq, Quebec
 Fort George, a North West Company post near Buckingham House, Alberta

Cayman Islands
 Fort George, George Town, a heritage site on Grand Cayman

Croatia
 Fort George, a fort on the Island of Vis built in 1812 to protect the harbour and town of Vis (town).

French Polynesia
 A fort in Tubuai built and then abandoned in 1789 by the Bounty mutineers

Grenada
 Fort George, an eighteenth-century fort in the capital, St. George's, Grenada

Guernsey, Channel Islands
 Fort George, Guernsey, the garrison fort of St Peter Port, Guernsey, constructed from 1780 to 1812

India
 Fort George, Bombay, an extension built to the fortified walls of Bombay

Jamaica
 Fort George, Jamaica, an eighteenth-century fort in Port Antonio

United Kingdom
 Fort George, Highland, a fortified garrison constructed from 1748 near Inverness, Scotland
 Fort George railway station, a former station nearby at Ardersier

United States
 Fort George, a frontier trading post in Colorado, also known as Fort Saint Vrain
 Fort George (Pensacola, Florida), a former American Revolutionary War fort in Pensacola, Florida
 Fort George (Brunswick, Maine), (1715–1737)
 Fort George (Castine, Maine), (1779), a British fort in the American Revolution and War of 1812
 Fort George, former name of Fort Holmes on Mackinac Island, Michigan
 Fort George, Manhattan, a neighborhood in the extreme northern part of Washington Heights, Manhattan, New York City
 Fort Amsterdam, a British fort in New York City during the American Revolution, also known as Fort George
 Fort George, New York, five different forts in various parts of New York State, built at various times
 Fort George, Oregon, the new name for Fort Astoria after the North West Company purchased it from the Pacific Fur Company in 1813
 Fort George, former name of Fort Wolcott on Goat Island, Rhode Island
 Fort George (Virginia), a 1728 fort on the site of a 1632 fort at or near the later Fort Monroe

Others
 Fort George (Belize House constituency), Belize
 RFA Fort George (A388), combined fleet stores ship and tanker of the Royal Fleet Auxiliary